The Simard Formation is a geologic formation in Quebec. It preserves fossils dating back to the Ordovician period.

See also

 List of fossiliferous stratigraphic units in Quebec

References
 

Ordovician Quebec
Ordovician southern paleotemperate deposits